Emily Stannard may refer to:

Emily Coppin Stannard (1802–1885), an English still life painter
Emily Stannard (1875–1906), a watercolourist primarily associated with Bedfordshire, England